"Hasta el Amanecer" is a song by American singer Nicky Jam. The song won the Billboard Music Award for Top Latin Song at the 2017 Billboard Music Awards. It also won the Urban Song of the Year and was nominated for Single of the Year at the 29th Lo Nuestro Awards.

Background 
"Hasta el Amanecer" was released on January 15, 2016 on U.S. radios. Billboard called the song a "sultry, sexy reggaetón track" that contains the singer's "trademark catchy melodic hooks. Still a hopeless romantic, here Jam pines after a girl he met at the laundromat, and let go, without even finding out her name."

Music video
The music video was viewed over 53 million times on YouTube after three weeks, for which Billboards Suzette Fernandez predicted that Jam will have a prosperous award season in 2017.

As of April 2020, the song's music video has over 1.4 billion views on YouTube.

Chart performance 
"Hasta el Amanecer" peaked at number one on the Hot Latin Songs chart on the issue dated March 9, 2016. The song displaced Colombian reggaeton singer J Balvin's 22-week record "Ginza" from the top of the chart. "Hasta el Amanecer" became the second song by Jam to peak at number one following "El Perdón" with Spanish pop singer Enrique Iglesias in 2015. The song also took Digital Gainer on the Hot Latin Songs chart for selling 3,000 digital downloads as well as a 7% spike in streams across U.S. radios with 1.7 million audience impressions. With this, the song also peaked at number one on the Latin Airplay chart, his third single topper.

"With You Tonight (Hasta el Amanecer)" 

Jam released an English version of the song, retitled "With You Tonight (Hasta el Amanecer)", on April 22, 2016. The English version was remixed with a verse performed by American rapper Kid Ink.

Charts

Weekly charts

Year-end charts

Decade-end charts

All-time charts

Certifications

See also
 List of number-one Billboard Hot Latin Songs of 2016

References

2016 singles
2016 songs
Nicky Jam songs
Songs written by Nicky Jam
Kid Ink songs
Sony Music Latin singles
Spanish-language songs